Bligh is a 1992 Australian sitcom, set in colonial New South Wales, in 1807 and based on the life of Sir William Bligh, as Colonial Governor.

Cast
 Michael Veitch ... Governor William Bligh
 Magda Szubanski ... Betsy Bligh
 William McInnes ... John Macarthur
 Gina Riley ... Elizabeth Macarthur
 Peter Moon ... Reverend Marsden
 Jimeoin ... Convict Griffin

References

External links
Bligh at IMDb
Bligh at Australian Television

Seven Network original programming
Australian television sitcoms
1992 Australian television series debuts
Television shows set in colonial Australia